Hasan Doğan (15 March 1956 – 5 July 2008) was the 37th president of the Turkish Football Federation. He died of a heart attack in Bodrum, a popular tourist destination in the southwest Turkish Riviera, where he was on vacation. He was incumbent for a relatively short period, beginning on 14 February 2008 and serving until his death on 5 July 2008.

During his presidency, the Turkish national football team qualified for the semi-finals at UEFA Euro 2008, held in Austria and Switzerland.

The 2015–16 season of the Turkish Süper Lig was named in his honour.

Personal
He was married to Aysel Doğan, who accompanied him to Euro 2008. He had two children, Zeynep and Selim.

References

External links
 Doğan's profile on spor3 
 Doğan's profile on haberturk 

1956 births
2008 deaths
People from Kastamonu
Turkish Football Federation presidents
Yıldız Technical University alumni
Burials at Topkapı Cemetery
Turkish sports executives and administrators